Marine botany is the study of flowering vascular plant species and marine algae that live in shallow seawater of the open ocean and the littoral zone, along shorelines of the intertidal zone and coastal wetlands, even in low-salinity brackish water of estuaries.

It is a branch of marine biology and botany.

Marine Plant Classifications 
There are five kingdoms that present-day classifications group organisms into: the Monera, Protist, Plantae, Fungi, and Animalia.

The Monera 
Less than 2,000 species of bacteria occur in the marine environment out of the 100,000 species. Although this group of species is small, they play a tremendous role in energy transfer, mineral cycles, and organic turnover. The monera differs from the four other kingdoms as "members of the Monera have a prokaryotic cytology in which the cells lack membrane-bound organelles such as chloroplasts, mitochondria, nuclei, and complex flagella."

The bacteria can be divided into two major subkingdoms: Eubacteria and Archaebacteria.

Eubacteria 
Eubacteria include the only bacteria that contain chlorophyll a. Not only that, but Eubacteria are placed in the divisions of Cyanobacteria and Prochlorophyta.

Characteristics of Eubacteria:

 They do not have any membrane-bound organelles.
 Most are enclosed by a cellular wall.

Archaebacteria 
Archaebacteria are a type of single-cell organism and have a number of characteristics not seen in more "modern" cell types. These characteristics include:

 Unique cell membrane chemistry
 Unique gene transcription
 Capable of methanogenesis
 Differences in ribosomal RNA

Types of Archaebacteria:

 Thermoproteota: Extremely heat-tolerant
 "Euryarchaeota": Able to survive in very salty habitats
 "Korarchaeota": The oldest lineage of archaebacteria

Archaebacteria vs. Eubacteria 
While both are prokaryotic, these organisms exist in different biological domains because of how genetically different they are. Some believe archaebacteria are some of the oldest forms of life on Earth while eubacteria arose later in evolutionary history. As eubacteria are found in almost all environments, archaebacteria have been pushed to only the most extreme environments. These extreme environments include: high salinity lakes, thermal hot springs, and deep within the Earth's crust. Other differences include:

 While most eubacteria are susceptible to antibiotics, archaebacteria are not. 
 Archaebacteria typically do not infect humans.
 While eubacteria have the ability to form spores to survive adverse conditions, archaebacteria do not have this ability.

Kingdom Protist 
The Protist kingdom contains species that have been categorized due to the simplicity of their structure and being unicellular. These include protozoa, algae and slime molds. In marine ecosystems, macroalgae and microalgae make up a large portion of the photosynthetic organisms found. The algae can be then further categorized based on these characteristics:

 Storage products
 Photosynthetic pigments
 Chloroplast structure
 Inclusions of the cell
 Cell wall structure
 Flagella structure
 Cell division
 Life history

The algae in the Protist kingdom can be placed into three different categories of macroalgae/seaweeds—phaeophyta, rhodophyta or chlorophyta. The microalgae in these marine environments can be categorized into four varieties—pyrrhophyta, chrysophyta, euglenophyta or cryptophyta.

Examples of the types of organisms found in the Protist Kingdom are red, green and brown algae.

Kingdom Plantae 
The Plantae Kingdoms consists of angiosperms-plants that produce seeds or flower as a part of their reproductive system. About 0.085% of the 300,000 Angiosperms believed to exist can be found in marine like environments.

Some examples of what plants in this kingdom exist are mosses, ferns, seagrasses, mangroves, and salt marsh plants—the last three being the three major communities of angiosperms in marine waters.

Seagrasses are recognized as some of the most important member to marine communities. It is the only true submerged angiosperm and can help determine the state of an ecosystem. Seagrass helps identify the conditions of an ecosystem, as the presence of this plant aids the environment by: Stabilizing the water's bottom, providing shelter and food for animals, and maintaining water quality.

Marine ecology
Marine ecology and marine botany include:
 Benthic zone 
 Coral reef
 Kelp forests
 Mangroves
 Phytoplankton 
 Salt marsh
 Sea grass
 Seaweed

See also

 Aquatic plants
 Aquatic ecology
 "Aquatic Botany" — scientific journal
 Phycology — study of algae
 Index: Marine botany
 Marine primary production

References 

 
Biological oceanography
Aquatic ecology
.
Seaweeds
Branches of botany
Oceanographical terminology